The 2012 Big East men's basketball tournament, officially known as the 2012 Big East Championship, was the 33rd annual Big East men's basketball tournament, deciding the champion of the 2011–12 Big East Conference men's basketball season. For the 30th consecutive season, the tournament was held at Madison Square Garden in New York City, from March 6–10, 2012. The tournament was the last to feature participation from West Virginia as they joined the Big 12 Conference on July 1, 2012.

In the final, Louisville defeated Cincinnati, 50–44, to win their second Big East championship in school history. Louisville guard Peyton Siva received the Dave Gavitt Trophy as the most outstanding player of the tournament.

Seeds
This was the fourth Big East tournament to include all 16 of the conference's teams. The teams finishing nine through 16 in the regular season standings played first round games, while teams five through eight received byes to the second round. The top four teams during the regular season received double-byes to the quarterfinals.

Schedule
All tournament games were nationally televised on an ESPN network:

Bracket
All rankings from AP Poll:

OT denotes overtime game

All-Tournament team
Following the tournament final, the Big East Conference named its All-Tournament team, composed of the top performers from the entire tournament. Louisville guard Peyton Siva was awarded the Dave Gavitt Trophy as the tournament's most outstanding player, the first time a Louisville player received the tournament MVP award.

† Received Dave Gavitt Trophy (Most Outstanding Player)

See also
 2012 Big East women's basketball tournament

References 

Tournament
Big East men's basketball tournament
Basketball in New York City
College sports in New York City
Sports competitions in New York City
Sports in Manhattan
Big East men's basketball tournament
Big East men's basketball tournament
2010s in Manhattan
Madison Square Garden